Kiuchi (written: 木内 or きうち in hiragana) is a Japanese surname. Notable people with the surname include:

 (born 1969), Japanese voice actor
 (born 1960), Japanese manga artist and film director
 (1866–1925), Japanese politician
 (born 1967), Japanese novelist
 (born 1968), Japanese voice actress
 (born 1994), Japanese singer and actress

See also
, brewery in Naka, Ibaraki Prefecture, Japan
5481 Kiuchi, main-belt asteroid

Japanese-language surnames